Robert Albert Lennon (September 15, 1928 – June 14, 2005), nicknamed "Archie", was an American professional baseball player. Although Lennon struggled at the Major League level in three different trials during the mid-1950s, he was a prolific home run hitter in minor league baseball, hitting 278 homers in a 16-year career and setting the single-season home run record for the Double-A Southern Association when he belted 64 for the 1954 Nashville Vols.

He signed with his hometown Brooklyn Dodgers in 1945. After three seasons in the low minors, he was acquired by the Dodgers' bitter rivals, the New York Giants, who became the parent club of the Vols in 1952.

The Vols played at Sulphur Dell, which was famous for its short right field fence — which was only  from home plate.  The park's dimensions favored  pull-hitting, left-handed batters like Lennon, and he smashed 24 homers in his first year with Nashville, in 1953. The following season, he adjusted his swing and shattered the Southern Association home run record, clubbing 64 homers in 153 games played, which would stand as the SA's all-time record during its 61-year (1901–1961) history. He also knocked home a league-leading 161 runs batted in, won the Triple Crown by posting a .345 batting average, and led the league in runs scored (139) and hits (210).  The breakout season led to Lennon's first MLB trial, as a late-season callup for the pennant-bound 1954 Giants.

Lennon did not stick with the 1955 Giants. He was sent to the Triple-A Minneapolis Millers of the American Association, where he hit 31 home runs and batted .280 with 104 RBI.  The following season, he had his longest Major League stint with the 1956 Giants, appearing in 26 games, including 21 in the outfield, but he batted only .182 with one extra base hit, a double. He was then sent to the Chicago Cubs in an off-season trade, where he made his final appearances in MLB during the early weeks of the  season.  As a Cub, he hit his only Major League home run, in Brooklyn's Ebbets Field on April 30, 1957, a three-run shot off former Giant teammate Sal Maglie.

Lennon was reacquired by the Dodgers after that season, and played four more seasons of Triple-A baseball, including seasons of 28 and 27 home runs for the Montreal Royals of the International League. Lennon then retired after the 1961 season. As a minor leaguer, he batted .281 in 1,784 games, with 1,699 hits and 1,067 RBI to go with his 278 four-baggers.

In between, Lennon played winter with the Navegantes del Magallanes in Venezuela add the Cangrejeros de Santurce in Puerto Rico, appearing for them in the Caribbean Series in the 1955 and 1959 editions, respectively.

Bob Lennon died at age 76 in Dix Hills, New York.

References

External links

Corbett, Warren, Bob Lennon, Society for American Baseball Research Biography Project
Retrosheet

1928 births
2005 deaths
Baseball players from New York (state)
Cangrejeros de Santurce (baseball) players
Chicago Cubs players
Daytona Beach Islanders players
Jacksonville Tars players
Johnstown Johnnies players
Liga de Béisbol Profesional Roberto Clemente outfielders
Major League Baseball outfielders
Minneapolis Millers (baseball) players
Montreal Royals players
Nashville Vols players
Navegantes del Magallanes players
American expatriate baseball players in Venezuela
New York Giants (NL) players
San Diego Padres (minor league) players
Sioux City Soos players
Sportspeople from Brooklyn
Baseball players from New York City
St. Paul Saints (AA) players
Syracuse Chiefs players
Thomasville Dodgers players